The Men's Under-23 Individual Road Race at the 1998 UCI Road World Championships was held on October 9, 1998, in Valkenburg, Netherlands, over a total distance of 172 kilometres (10 x 17.2 km laps). There were a total number of 180 starters, with 130 cyclists actually finishing the race.

Final classification

References
Results

Men's Under-23 Road Race
UCI Road World Championships – Men's under-23 road race